Timothy Ralph Danielson is a former American middle-distance runner. He is one of only 17 U.S. high school athletes to ever run the mile in under four minutes. In 2014, he was convicted of the first-degree murder of his ex-wife.

High school
While running for Chula Vista High School in Chula Vista, California, Danielson became the second high school 4-minute miler when he ran a 3:59.4 mile at San Diego's Balboa Stadium on June 11, 1966. His mile time puts him sixth on the all-time high school miler list, behind Alan Webb's 3:53.43 (2001), Jim Ryun's 3:55.3 (1965), Drew Hunter's 3:58.25, Reed Brown's 3:59.3 (2017), Matthew Maton's 3:59.38 (2015), and Grant Fisher's 3:59.38 (2015), and is the fastest time ever run by a California high school student.

He won the mile race at the CIF California State Meet in 1965 with a time of 4:08.0 and again the next year with a time of 4:07.0. He won the Golden West Invitational High School meet two-mile race in 1966 in a time of 8:55.4.  He was Track and Field News "High School Athlete of the Year" in 1966.

College
After high school Danielson attended Brigham Young University, where he competed for the track team for a year but never managed to break four minutes for the mile again.  He was in the race at the 1967 National Championships where Jim Ryun set the world record at 3:51.1.  After running second for much of the race, he faded near the end, finishing 8th in just over 4 minutes.  During that same race, Marty Liquori became the third high school 4 minute miler, a step ahead of him.  Danielson's career direction changed.  Ryun said "I lost track of Tim after that."  He married Carolyn Mooers in February 1968, their first son was born in June, all distractions at the same time he was attempting to qualify for the 1968 Olympics.  Before professionalism was allowed "In those days, if anyone married they were finished." said Liquori.

Personal
Danielson began working as an engineer for GKN Aerospace Engine Products in El Cajon, California in 1971. He married his third wife, Ming Qi in 2006; they divorced in 2008.

On June 16, 2011, Danielson was charged in the murder of Ming Qi.  He pleaded not guilty.  During the trial, Danielson claimed the murder was a suicide attempt, a result of his use of Chantix, a drug known a history of these side effects, included in disclaimers attached to its advertising.

On May 12, 2014 Danielson was convicted of first-degree murder. On July 11, 2014, Danielson was sentenced to 50 years to life in prison.

References

External links
 California State Records before 2000

American male middle-distance runners
1948 births
BYU Cougars men's track and field athletes
Living people
Sportspeople from Chula Vista, California
Track and field athletes from California
American sportspeople convicted of crimes
American people convicted of murder
People convicted of murder by California
Prisoners sentenced to life imprisonment by California